Eye of the Storm is a 2015 Burkinabé psychological drama film about child soldiers. The film was directed by Sékou Traoré, produced by Axel Guyot, written by Christophe Lemoine and Luis Marques, and starred Fargrass Assandre and Maἴmouna N'diaye. It received ten nominations at the 12th Africa Movie Academy Awards and won in three categories including Best Film.

Synopsis 
Based on the study of child soldiers, Sékou Traoré's film brings us to Emma Tou (N'Diaye), a young lawyer who reluctantly accepts to defend a captured fugitive who may have been a child soldier, in what her boss titles "The Trial of the Century". Persistent to ensure a good and fair trial for the fugitive, Tou visits former child soldier Blackshouam Vila (Fargass) and tries to win his trust so he will help her in her case. But as Vila begins to tell her his history, Tou discovers the terrors of a child forced to fight in the military.

As Vila tells Tou how he is wavering between celebrating his awful crimes and lamenting about his nightmares, which frequently include his past victims.

The more Tou digs into the subject of child soldiers, the more she finds that points to government officials' involvement in causing Vila's turbulent childhood. Readying court, Tou is sealed into a search for truth where heroes and villains are no more than shades of gray.

Cast
 Maïmouna N'Diaye - Emma Tou
 Fargass Assandé - Blackshouam Vila
Abidine Dioari - Solo
 Issaka Sawouadogo - Roc
 Jacob Sou - President of the Bar
 Serge Henry - Father Tu
 Fatou Traoré - Emma's Sister

References

External links

2015 films
More-language films
2010s psychological drama films
Films directed by Sékou Traoré
Best Film Africa Movie Academy Award winners
2015 drama films
Burkinabé drama films
French psychological drama films
2010s French films